The 5th Race of Champions was a non-Championship motor race, run to Formula One rules, held on 22 March 1970 at Brands Hatch circuit in Kent, England. The race was run over 50 laps of the circuit, and was won by Jackie Stewart in a March 701.

Classification

References 
 Results at Silhouet.com 
 Results at F1 Images.de 

Race of Champions
Race of Champions (Brands Hatch)
Gold
Race of Champions